Joseph Louis François Paradis is a Canadian politician, who was elected to the National Assembly of Quebec in a byelection on October 20, 2014. He represents the electoral district of Lévis as a member of the Coalition Avenir Québec. After the 2018 Quebec general election Paradis was elected President of the National Assembly of Quebec.

Prior to his election to the legislature, Paradis worked for TVA, where he was a host of Café show, L'enfer ou le Paradis, Première ligne and TVA en direct.com.

References

External links

 

Living people
Coalition Avenir Québec MNAs
French Quebecers
Canadian television hosts
People from Lévis, Quebec
Politicians from Quebec City
People from Sorel-Tracy
21st-century Canadian politicians
1957 births